is a Japanese hip-hop musician and songwriter best known for his collaborations with singer Thelma Aoyama, "Koko ni Iru yo" and "Soba ni Iru ne" – the latter of which was the former Guinness World Records holder for the best selling digital single of all-time in Japan (until it was superseded by Greeeen's "Kiseki").

He has worked with various Japanese singers, including Thelma Aoyama, Issa, Rola, and Misslim.

Biography 
SoulJa's mother is Belgian and his father is Japanese. He studied music, learning how to play the violin, cello and piano from a young age, due to the influence of his mother. During his childhood, he spent time in Belgium, Japan and the United States. At 15, he grew to love hip-hop music.

In 2003, he returned to Japan, and began creating music. He got his first big break when a song of his, "First Contact," was featured in a commercial for Men's Beauteen (featuring actor Joe Odagiri) in 2005. This led to several more offers to write commercial music for companies such as magazine Oggi, along with SoulJa's independent label debut. In late 2005, he released the EP First Contact under Rock & Hill Records.

In 2007, SoulJa debuted as a major label artist with Universal Music Japan. His third single, "Koko ni Iru yo" featuring R&B singer Thelma Aoyama, became a long selling hit, staying in Oricon's top 10 singles for five weeks. Eventually, by March 2008, the song had been certified by the RIAJ for selling over 1,000,000+ ringtones, 1,000,000+ cellphone full-length downloads and 100,000 PC downloads.

SoulJa's debut album, Spirits, released two and a half months later, was a modest success, breaking the top 10 on Oricon and selling over 66,000 copies.

In January 2008, Thelma Aoyama released her own answer version to the song, "Soba ni Iru ne." This version outstripped the popularity of the original, topping the RIAJ's monthly ringtone chart for three months, peaking at No. 1 on Oricon's single sales charts and eventually being certified by Guinness World Records as the best digital single in Japan of all-time (an award it held for a year).

After the extreme popularity of this version, SoulJa re-released Spirits, featuring a self-cover of this version (featuring vocalist Yukie).

SoulJa's second album, Colorz, was preceded by two singles:  feat. Misslim (a pseudonym for Yumi Matsutoya) and "One Time" feat. Issei & Jin Oki. The album did not do as well as his previous, only reaching No. 106 on Oricon's album charts. "Kinenbi" was a minor hit, charting in the top 20 on RIAJ's Chaku-uta chart for two months.

In January 2010, SoulJa released his 6th single, "Way to Love (Saigo no Koi)" feat. Miho Karasawa. It was a digital hit, being certified by the RIAJ for selling 100,000 copies after charting for two months. This will be followed by his third album, Letters, along with the leading single "Hanasanaide yo" featuring Thelma Aoyama. SoulJa also worked together with Aoyama on her single "Kaeru Basho," writing the song.

Discography

Albums

EPs

Singles

As lead artist 

* charted on monthly Chaku-uta Reco-kyō Chart.†Japan Hot 100 established February 2008, RIAJ Digital Track Chart established April 2009.

As a featured artist

Other appearances 

He also graduated Christian Academy in Japan.

References

External links 
 Official Site 
 Universal Label Site 

Living people
Japanese male pop singers
Japanese male singer-songwriters
Japanese singer-songwriters
Japanese-language singers
1983 births
Universal Music Japan artists
Japanese hip hop musicians
People from Western Tokyo
Japanese people of Belgian descent
People from Higashikurume, Tokyo
21st-century Japanese singers
21st-century Japanese male singers